Min Thein Kha (born Aung Htun; 25 June 1939 – 1 August 2008) was a prominent Burmese writer, astrologer and political prisoner. He began his literary career in 1976, adopting the pseudonym Min Theinkha, and wrote hundreds of novels and short stories throughout his career, including notable works such as Manusari, Ponna Ba Kun and Sanay Maung Maung. He is best known for a series of detective novels set in Colonial Burma, featuring the hero Sarpalin Hnin Maung. He was also a well-known astrologer and later taught astrology from his compound in Yangon Region's Hmawbi Township. He died on 1 August 2008 at a private hospital in Kamayut Township in Yangon.

References

Burmese writers
1939 births
People from Yangon
2008 deaths